Abu Shakur Balkhi (born possibly in 912-13) was one of the most important Persian poets of the Samanid period.

He was a contemporary of Rudaki, and wrote three masnavis, the work Āfarin nama (written in 944) among them. Only 192 scraps of his verses remain today.

References

Sources
 E.G. Browne. Literary History of Persia. (Four volumes, 2,256 pages, and twenty-five years in the writing). 1998. 
 Jan Rypka, History of Iranian Literature. Reidel Publishing Company. ASIN B-000-6BXVT-K

See also
List of Persian poets and authors

910s births
Year of death missing
10th-century Persian-language poets
Samanid-period poets
People from Balkh
10th-century Iranian people